Calothamnus affinis is a plant in the myrtle family, Myrtaceae and is endemic to the south-west of Western Australia. It is an erect, compact, or spreading shrub with red to purple flowers in spring.

Description
The flowers have 5 sepals, 5 petals and stamens joined to form 5 claw-like bundles.

Distribution and habitat
Calothamnus affinis occurs in the far south of Western Australia in the Stirling Range district in the Avon Wheatbelt, Esperance Plains and Jarrah Forest biogeographic regions. It grows in sandy soils and laterite.

Taxonomy and naming
Calothamnus affinis was first formally described in 1852 by Nikolai Turczaninow. The specific epithet (affinis) means "allied to" or "akin to", and refers to the similarity of this species to Calothamnus gracilis.

In 2014 Craven, Edwards and Cowley  proposed that the species be renamed Melaleuca relativa but the name is not accepted by the Australian Plant Census.

Conservation
This species is classified as "not threatened" by the Western Australian Government Department of Parks and Wildlife.

References

affinis
Myrtales of Australia
Plants described in 1852
Endemic flora of Western Australia
Taxa named by Nikolai Turczaninow